A swordsman is a practitioner of swordsmanship.

Swordsman may also refer to:
 Swordsman (character), a Marvel Comics character
 Swordsman Online, a martial arts MMORPG from Perfect World Entertainment
 The Swordsman (1948 film), a US film
 The Swordsman (1974 film), a British film
 The Swordsman (1990 film), a Hong Kong film
 Swordsman II, its 1992 sequel
 The East Is Red, the third movie in the trilogy, also known as  Swordsman III
 The Swordsman (2020 film), a South Korean film
 Swordsman (TV series), a Chinese TV series
 Laughing in the Wind, a Chinese TV series, known as Swordsman in some regions

See also 
 Sword (disambiguation)